The Valencian People's Union (in Valencian: Unitat del Poble Valencià, UPV) was a political alliance created in 1982 when the Left Grouping of the Valencian Country (AEPV) and the Nationalist Party of the Valencian Country (PNPV) merged to contest the 1982 general election. In 1983, the United Left of the Valencian Country joined the coalition to contest the 1983 regional election. In 1984, AEPV and PNPV became a unified party.

Electoral performance

Corts Valencianes

 * In coalition with United Left of the Valencian Country.
 ** In coalition with Nationalist Bloc.

Cortes Generales

Valencian Community

 * In coalition with Nationalist Bloc.

References

Political parties in the Valencian Community
Valencian nationalism
Left-wing nationalist parties